Scleria is a genus of flowering plants in the sedge family, Cyperaceae. They are known commonly as nutrushes. They are distributed throughout the tropical world, and some have ranges extending into temperate areas. There are about 200 species.

The genus name Scleria is Greek, meaning "hardness", in reference to the tough seeds.

Plants of this genus are diverse in appearance. These are mostly perennial, but sometimes annual. Some have rhizomes. They produce solitary stems or clumps of many. They are a few centimeters tall to well over one meter. They have few leaves or many. The inflorescence is variable, bearing a single spikelet to over 100. Despite the variety, examination of the fruits and subterranean structures is required to distinguish species.

References

External links
Camelbeke, K. and P. Goetghebeur. (2002). The genus Scleria (Cyperaceae) in Colombia. An updated checklist. Caldasia 24(2), 259–68.

 
Cyperaceae genera
Taxonomy articles created by Polbot